Forbidden Fruit (Spanish: Fruto Prohibido or Fruto de tentación) is a 1953 Mexican drama film directed by Alfredo B. Crevenna and starring Arturo de Córdova, Irasema Dilián and María Douglas.

Cast
 Arturo de Córdova as Marcos Villarreal  
 Irasema Dilián as Minú  
 María Douglas as Bárbara  
 Jorge Reyes as Ramón  
 Eduardo Alcaraz as Felipe, mayordomo 
 Fanny Schiller as Señorita directora
 Luz María Aguilar as Estudiante colegio  
 Amparo Arozamena as La actriz  
 Lonka Becker as Profesora colegio  
 Victorio Blanco as Botones 
 Ada Carrasco as Señora Luz María Gómez  
 Lupe Carriles as Fan de Villareal  
 Ethel Carrillo as Estudiante colegio  
 Roberto Corell as Artemio  
 María Cortés 
 Linda Cristal as Julia  
 Rafael Estrada as Gerente hotel  
 Miguel Ángel Ferriz as Señor Vidal  
 Emilio Garibay as Apolonio Martínez 
 Hilda Grey as Virginia  
 Luis Guevara as Juanito  
 Rosario Gálvez as Olga  
 Ana María Hernández as Invitada al baile  
 Ismael Larumbe as Gervasio  
 Cecilia Leger as Invitada a fiesta  
 Elena Luquín as Estudiante colegio  
 Tana Lynn as Greta  
 Pepe Martínez as Invitado a baile  
 Héctor Mateos as Invitado a baile  
 Álvaro Matute as Invitado al baile  
 Kika Meyer as Fan de Villarreal  
 Roberto Meyer as Invitado al baile 
 Alicia Montoya 
 Irlanda Mora as Estudiante colegio 
 Diana Ochoa as Mamá de Juanito 
 Ignacio Peón as Juez en boda  
 Carlos Robles Gil as Invitado al baile  
 Joaquín Roche as Invitado al baile  
 Alicia Rodríguez as Meche  
 Félix Samper as Pariente de Minú 
 Manuel Santigosa as Notario 
 Alta Mae Stone as Invitada gringa en fiesta  
 María Valdealde as Hortensia 
 Armando Velasco as Juez

References

Bibliography 
 María Luisa Amador. Cartelera cinematográfica, 1950-1959. UNAM, 1985.

External links 
 

1953 films
1953 drama films
Mexican drama films
1950s Spanish-language films
Films directed by Alfredo B. Crevenna
Mexican black-and-white films
1950s Mexican films